The Artist's Garden at Giverny (French:Le Jardin de l'artiste à Giverny) is an oil on canvas painting by Claude Monet done in 1900 now in the Musée d'Orsay, Paris.

It is one of many works by the artist of his garden at Giverny over the last thirty years of his life. The painting shows rows of irises in various shades of purple and pink set diagonally across the picture plane. The flowers are under trees that in allowing dappled light through change the tone of their colours. Beyond the trees is a glimpse of Monet's house.

In the context of Monet's oeuvre 

Monet was 60 years old the year he completed this painting, and had produced an immense body of work. He had become extraordinarily successful as well as famous. By this time, he was analysing what he saw more and more until, according to William Seitz, "subject, sensation and pictorial object have all but become identical".

In 1900, the year of this painting, he embarked on two major projects - a series of the River Thames in London and another series of his water gardens in Giverny, including some of his famous paintings of waterlilies, such as The Waterlily Pond (now in the Museum of Fine Arts Boston).

His dealer Durand-Ruel exhibited recent works, including a dozen Waterlilies and he bought his friend Renoir's painting Mosque (Arabian Festival).

The garden
Monet worked on and developed the garden that is the subject of the painting from the end of 1883 until the end of his life.

Comparable paintings

Exhibitions

As well as in France, Le Jardin de l'artiste à Giverny has been exhibited in Australia, Belgium, Korea, Italy, Japan, Switzerland and the United States.

See also
List of paintings by Claude Monet
 Water Lilies (Monet series)

References

Paintings by Claude Monet